Luminex Corporation | A DiaSorin Company is a biotechnology company which develops, manufactures and markets proprietary biological testing technologies with applications in life-sciences.



Background
Luminex's Multi-Analyte Profiling (xMAP) technology allows simultaneous analysis of up to 500 bioassays from a small sample volume, typically a single drop of fluid, by reading biological tests on the surface of microscopic polystyrene beads called microspheres.

The  xMAP technology combines this miniaturized liquid array bioassay capability with small lasers, light emitting diodes (LEDs), digital signal processors, photo detectors, charge-coupled device imaging and proprietary software to create a system offering advantages in speed, precision, flexibility and cost. The technology is currently being used within various segments of the life sciences industry, which includes the fields of drug discovery and development, and for clinical diagnostics, genetic analysis, bio-defense, food safety and biomedical research.

The Luminex MultiCode technology is used for real-time polymerase chain reaction (PCR) and multiplexed PCR assays. Luminex Corporation owns 315 issued patents worldwide, including over 124 issued patents in the United States based on its multiplexing xMAP platform.

References

External links

 

Immunology organizations
Biological techniques and tools
Companies based in Austin, Texas
Life sciences industry
Companies formerly listed on the Nasdaq
Biotechnology companies of the United States
2021 mergers and acquisitions
American subsidiaries of foreign companies